La Forest-Landerneau is a commune in the Finistère department of Brittany in northwestern France.

Population
Inhabitants of La Forest-Landerneau are called in French Forestois.

See also
Communes of the Finistère department
List of the works of Bastien and Henry Prigent

References

External links
Official website 

Mayors of Finistère Association 

Communes of Finistère